Qıpçaq (Гыпчаг and قيپچاق; also, Kypchag, Kypchak, and Kypchakh) is a village and municipality in the Qakh Rayon of Azerbaijan.  It has a population of 616.

References

See also 
 Gypjak
 Kipchak people

Populated places in Qakh District